Newbridge is a largely residential electoral ward on the western edge of Bath, England.

Geography
The Newbridge electoral ward can be divided into three areas from south to north:
Locksbrook: an industrial and residential area between the River Avon and the former Mangotsfield and Bath railway line
Newbridge: a largely residential area alongside and in between Newbridge Road (A4 road) and Newbridge Hill (A431 road), and also extending north-west alongside Penn Lea Road
Combe Park: an area in the north-east of the ward consisting of the Royal United Hospital, Lansdown Cricket Club and residential housing alongside Combe Park road and Cedric Road.

The main shopping area in Newbridge is Chelsea Road, a small area of shops, restaurants and hairdressers. Shops include a bakery, a hardware shop, a SPAR supermarket, a cycle shop and nearby on Newbridge Road a post office.

Bath's major hospital, the Royal United Hospital, is in the north-east of the ward in Combe Park, bordering Weston village. Lansdown Cricket Club's ground is alongside the hospital. Weston Recreation Ground is in Newbridge ward.

Newbridge is the location of Partis College, which was built as large block of almshouses between 1825 and 1827. It is designated as a Grade I listed building.

The National Cycle Network Bristol and Bath Railway Path runs westward from Newbridge to Bristol, and a continuation riverside cycle and footpath runs eastward into central Bath. Newbridge Park and Ride is just off the A4 road on the western edge of the ward, alongside the Newbridge Meadows village green.

Since boundary changes effected at the elections held on 2 May 2019 the ward now also includes two civil parishes outside the city boundary: Kelston and North Stoke.

History

The New Bridge 

The area is named after the New Bridge over the River Avon outside Bath, built in 1734. This was built to replace a ford that was one of the last impediments to navigation between Bristol and Bath. The bridge had pierced spandrels and arches on either side to allow flood water to pass easily. The bridge was widened and improved in the 1830s to the version that now carries the A4 road from Bath to Bristol out of Newbridge.

Development as a suburb 
The Weston Hotel was built circa 1890 close to Weston railway station, and was a prominent building at the Bath end of Newbridge Road. It is a 4-storey building in the arts and crafts style, designed by architect William Frederick Unsworth, and was Grade II listed in 2011. It operated as a public house until 2019. This area was initially called Lower Weston as it was en route to Weston village, but is now the eastern end of Newbridge ward.

From about 1902 to 1939 a tram service from central Bath to Newton St Loe operated down Newbridge Road and across the bridge.

In 1915 Sidney Horstmann and his brothers built a large factory, Newbridge Works, in what was then the outskirts of Bath. The general engineering company, The Horstmann Gear Company, specialised in gas street lighting controls, time switches, gauges, and latterly central heating controls, used "Newbridge" as a trademark for some of its products. The factory closed in 2000, and the site was redeveloped for housing.

Schools
Educationally, Newbridge is part of the North West Bath area of Bath and North East Somerset. This area has three primary schools:
 Newbridge Primary School
 St Mary's Catholic Primary School
 Weston All Saints CE VC Primary School

and one secondary school:
 Oldfield School
though at secondary school level, many of the girls from the Newbridge area attend Hayesfield Girls' School and many of the boys attend Beechen Cliff School.

See also
Fairfield House, Bath
Minerva Bath Rowing Club
Weston Lock

References

External links

Newbridge ID 9732, Unitary Authority ward map, mysociety.org
Ward Profile – Newbridge, Bath and North East Somerset

Areas of Bath, Somerset
Electoral wards in Bath and North East Somerset
Bridges across the River Avon, Bristol